Persecution and the Art of Writing, published in 1952 by the Free Press, is a book of collected articles written by Leo Strauss. The book contains five previously published essays, many of which were significantly altered by Strauss from their original publication. The general theme of the book is the relationship between politics and philosophy. The thesis of the book is that many ancient and early modern political philosophers, in order to avoid persecution, hid their most heterodox ideas within their texts.

Overview
Strauss's general argument — rearticulated throughout his subsequent writings, most notably in The City and Man (1964) — is that prior to the 19th century, Western scholars commonly understood that philosophical writing is not at home in any polity, no matter how liberal.  Insofar as it questions conventional wisdom, philosophy must guard itself especially against those readers who believe themselves authoritative, wise, and liberal defenders of the status quo.  In questioning established opinions, or in investigating the principles of morality, pre-modern philosophers found it necessary to convey their messages obliquely.  Their "art of writing" was the art of esoteric communication.  This is all the more apparent in medieval times, when heterodox political thinkers wrote under the threat of the Inquisition or comparably strict tribunals.

Strauss's argument is not that medieval writers reserved one exoteric meaning for the many and an esoteric hidden meaning for the initiated few, but rather that their writings' respective core meanings extended beyond their texts' literal and/or historical dimension.

Explicitly following Gotthold Ephraim Lessing's lead, Strauss indicates that medieval political philosophers, no less than their ancient counterparts, carefully adapted their written words to the dominant moral views of their time, lest their writings be condemned as heretical or unjust — not by "the many" (who did not read), but by those "few" whom the many regarded as the most righteous guardians of morality: precisely those few righteous personalities would be most inclined to persecute or ostracize anyone who is in the business of exposing the "noble lie" which supports the authority of the few over the many. Strauss thus presents Maimonides "as a closet nonbeliever obfuscating his message for political reasons."

Controversy and criticism 
Strauss's ideas in Persecution and the Art of Writing sparked controversy due to differing interpretations of the exoteric-esoteric dichotomy. Despite academic debate, no widely accepted interpretation of this dichotomy has emerged. Some scholars, e.g. Lampert, Frazer and Drury believe that Strauss wrote in an esoteric manner, while, others such as Batnitzky finds this idea wrong. The lack of consensus on the exoteric-esoteric dichotomy has led to conflicting interpretations of Strauss's ideas and even his character, resulting in a dispute that can be emotionally charged. For example, some view Strauss as a fascist, while others see him as a defender of democracy against Nazism.

Recent scholarship has criticized Strauss's theory on reading, specifically his premise in Persecution and the Art of Writing. Strauss suggests that esoteric writing is necessary to protect revolutionary ideas from the masses. However, linguistic evidence refutes this assumption. During the period in which most of the philosophers lived whom Strauss refers to in Persecution and the Art of Writing , the majority of people were illiterate. Moreover, even among the literate few, only a minority possessed the capacity to comprehend complex works of philosophy. As a result, this undermines Strauss's entire hypothesis.

In addition, recent scholarship also suggests that the very structure of language itself makes the inclusion of "esoteric" messages unnecessary. Language is inherently complex and ambiguous, allowing for multiple interpretations and levels of meaning. Thus, the idea that philosophers needed to hide their true beliefs in esoteric writing to protect themselves from persecution or to ensure their ideas were properly understood is questionable. Considering that neither Strauss, not his follower were able to provide evidence to support the hypothesis of PAW this further undermines Strauss's argument and highlights the importance of revisiting and reevaluating his theories.

Editions
 Leo Strauss, Persecution and the Art of Writing. Glencoe, Ill.: The Free Press, 1952. Reissued Chicago: University of Chicago Press, 1988.

References

Further reading
 Leo Strauss, Lecture Notes for 'Persecution and the Art of Writing'''. Critical edition by Hannes Kerber. Published in Yaffe/Ruderman (ed.): Reorientation: Leo Strauss in the 1930s.'' New York, NY.: Palgrave Macmillan, 2014, pp. 293–304.

1952 non-fiction books
Books by Leo Strauss
Books in political philosophy
Contemporary philosophical literature
Persecution
Philosophy essays
Essay collections